Xylotoloides huttoni is a species of beetle in the family Cerambycidae, and the only species in the genus Xylotoloides. It was described by Sharp in 1882.

References

Parmenini
Beetles described in 1882